Trematocara nigrifrons is a species of cichlid endemic to Lake Tanganyika.  This species can reach a length of  TL.

References

nigrifrons
Fish described in 1906
Taxonomy articles created by Polbot